Pimpalwadi is a village in the Barshi taluka of Solapur district in Maharashtra state, India.

Demographics
Covering  and comprising 212 households at the time of the 2011 census of India, Pimpalwadi had a population of 942. There were 493 males and 449 females, with 115 people being aged six or younger.

References

Villages in Solapur district